Nid or NID may refer to:

Science
 Nidogen-1, an extracellular protein
 Neuronal intestinal dysplasia, a condition involving abnormalities with the nerves supplying the bowel

Telecommunications
 Namespace Identifier, part of a Uniform Resource Name
 Network interface device, in telecommunications, providing demarcation between carrier and customer wiring

Organizations
 Naval Intelligence Department (Royal Navy), the intelligence arm of the British Admiralty from 1887 until 1912
 National Institute of Cultural Heritage, a Polish governmental institution
 National Institutes of Design, a group of Indian public design universities
 National Institute of Design, the primary institute, in Ahmedabad, Gujarat
 National Institute of Design, Andhra Pradesh, design school in Vijayawada, Andhra Pradesh
 National Institute of Design, Madhya Pradesh, design school in Bhopal, Madhya Pradesh
 National Institute of Design, Haryana, design school in Kurukshetra, Haryana
 National Institute of Design, Assam, design school in Jorhat, Assam
 National Intelligence Directorate (Pakistan), an intelligence organization of Pakistan
 Naval Intelligence Division (United Kingdom), of the British Admiralty, prior to 1965
 Naval Intelligence Division (Israel),  a staff unit in the Israeli navy headquarters
 National Investigation Department of Nepal, an intelligence agency of Nepal
 NID (Stargate), a fictional secret government organization in the television series Stargate SG-1
 Nieuport-Delage, an aircraft company from the 1920s and 1930s

Places
 The Nidelva or Nid River in Trondheim, Norway
 Nevada Irrigation District, in the Sierra Nevada foothills of California, organized to supply irrigation water

Other
 Nieuwe Intercity Dubbeldekker, the renovated NS DD-AR train.
 Nimzo-Indian Defence, a chess opening

See also 
Nidd (disambiguation)